Robert Young Collins (16 February 1931 – 13 January 2014) was a Scotland international football player, best known for his successful spells at Celtic, Everton and Leeds United.

Playing career

Celtic
Collins was born on 16 February 1931 in Govanhill, Glasgow, Scotland, the eldest of Tom and Bella Collins's six children. He signed a contract with Everton from Pollok at the age of 17, but after a contractual dispute he eventually ended up joining Celtic instead of Everton; he was also working as an apprentice cobbler at the time. He made his debut at outside-right against Old Firm rivals Rangers on 13 August 1949, getting the better of Jock Shaw he helped Celtic to a 3–2 Scottish League Cup victory. He was also called up for international duty in 1950, and maintained a frequent presence in the Scotland squad in the later stages of the decade. Collins also represented the Scottish League XI 16 times, scoring 12 goals.

Everton
In 1958 Collins joined Everton where he played until 1962.

Leeds United
Collins was an astute addition to the Leeds squad by manager Don Revie in 1962, helping the club avoid relegation. Revie later described Collins as his best ever signing. Leeds won promotion to the First Division in 1964, and Collins captained the side towards a potential League and FA Cup double a year later; however, Leeds missed out on the League on goal average to Manchester United, and lost the 1965 FA Cup Final to Liverpool. Collins's  achievements at Leeds were recognised when he was awarded the Footballer of the Year title in 1965. His sparkling form at Leeds also won him a recall to the Scotland squad after a six-year absence, and he earned three more caps. His international career ended with 31 appearances and ten goals. Collins continued to skipper Leeds until 1966, when he suffered a horrific broken thighbone in a Fairs Cup tie against Torino. He briefly came back from the injury, but age and a struggle to reclaim previous form brought his Leeds career to an end.

Later playing career
Bury signed Collins and he stayed there for two years.

During a short period back in his native Scotland with Greenock Morton, he doubled up as a scout for Revie, and recommended Joe Jordan. Jordan went on to become a respected and feared striker with Leeds, Manchester United, Milan and Scotland. Collins' last appearance for Morton was in August 1971, in a pre-season friendly against  his former club Leeds United.

In 1972 Collins was playing coach of Australian club Ringwood City but left after a disagreement with the club board.

He then had a spell as player-coach with Oldham.

Collins guested for Shamrock Rovers in a friendly with Manchester United at Dalymount Park on 15 October 1973 and signed for The Hoops the following month making his début on the 11th at Glenmalure Park. He played a total of 13 games, 11 in the league scoring once on his second appearance at Finn Harps.

Managerial career
Collins went into management, with spells at Huddersfield Town, Hull City and Barnsley. He also coached within the Leeds youth set-up in the 1970s and then again in the late 1990s.

Career statistics

Club

International

Scores and results list Scotland's goal tally first, score column indicates score after each Collins goal.

Managerial record

Honours

Notes

References

Sources 
 
 

1931 births
2014 deaths
Scottish footballers
Scotland international footballers
Association football midfielders
Pollok F.C. players
Scottish Junior Football Association players
Celtic F.C. players
Everton F.C. players
Leeds United F.C. players
Bury F.C. players
Greenock Morton F.C. players
Scottish expatriate footballers
Expatriate soccer players in Australia
Oldham Athletic A.F.C. players
Expatriate association footballers in the Republic of Ireland
Scottish expatriate sportspeople in Ireland
Shamrock Rovers F.C. players
Shamrock Rovers F.C. guest players
League of Ireland players
Scottish Football League players
Scottish Football League representative players
English Football League players
1958 FIFA World Cup players
Scottish football managers
Huddersfield Town A.F.C. managers
Hull City A.F.C. managers
Barnsley F.C. managers
English Football League managers
Oldham Athletic A.F.C. non-playing staff
Leeds United F.C. non-playing staff
Hull City A.F.C. non-playing staff
Blackpool F.C. non-playing staff
Barnsley F.C. non-playing staff
People from Govanhill and Crosshill
Ringwood City SC players
Southern Suburbs F.C. players
FA Cup Final players